Costumi is a frazione—a small hamlet—located in the commune of Torricella Sicura in the Italian Province of Teramo. The origins of the name date back to feudal times and refer to the usual and customary contributions ('costumi') that the denizens were expected to forward to the baronial landowners. The Costumarii were the local townsmen entrusted with this act.

In modern times Costumi is principally known for four diffused clusters of residences, each surrounded by woodlots and farmers' grain fields. These groups of houses are named San Pietro ad Azzano, Case Mancine, Villa Sciarra, and Colle Sansonesco. 

Data collected during the 12th census on 25 October 1981 provide the following population figures for Costumi:
 38 families
 63 men
 68 women
131 inhabitants

The local parish church of Costumi is Saint Peters (San Pietro), located in nearby Azzano.

San Pietro ad Azzano
This area formerly hosted a monastery, which later became a parish church. In medieval times a large feudal estate named University (Università) was located here, an ancient term given to the various communes comprising a large domain. 
The historian Bernardino Delfico posits that the word Azzano derives from the ancient gens Attia. Many people with the last name Attia (and its derivatives such as Attio, Attiano and Attia) live or have lived in this locality. 
The monastery (later a parish church) that was located in this area was administered by the Abbey of Farfa. It enjoyed the privileges and riches that accompanied this designation at least until the 19th century.

Case Mancine
This cluster of homes is located between San Pietro ad Azzano and Ioanella.

Villa Sciarra
This small cluster of houses is located between Colle Sansonesco and Ioanella. From this location one has a panoramic view of the Gran Sasso and the surrounding mountain chain.

Colle Sansonesco

In historical documents related Colle Sansonesco the area is sometimes referred to by various names include Collesansonesco, Collo Sansonesco, and Colle Santonesco. 
The famous historian Niccola Palma attributes the name of this area to a family called Sansone who were the likely owners.

Luigi Ercole in the beginning of the 1800s wrote about Colle Sansonesco in this way:   
This is a small village located about three miles southeast of Teramo.  It has 32 residents.  The land is steep and mountainous.  The main local product is acorns although grain and vineyards are also to be found....  
In the Regio Cedolario del 1787 (Royal Taxation Decree of 1787) the area is designated a feudo nobile, (noble feudal holding) i.e., a large aristocratic feud with certain delineated rights and responsibilities.

Past census data provide an interesting perspective into the area's history. Residents were grouped into fuochi (fireplaces) with the implication that each fireplace served as a gathering place for one family unit.  Thus a village having twenty "fuochi" had approximately this many families residing there at the time.  Colle Sansonesco was originally considered to be an outlying villa associated with the town, and belonging to baron, of Teramo.  Only later was it designated a Università (University), that is, a commune making up part of a domain, and not forming part of the baronial holdings.  This nomenclature was used in the Kingdom of Naples and certain of other states which later came together to form what is now known as modern Italy.

According to the 1754 census (Catasto Onciario) data:
Nuclear families: 7 (for a total of 48 people)
Absent families: 1
Non-clergy associated with the church: 2
Churches and related properties:  Madonna delle Grazie; San Pietro di Azzano; San Giacomo; Parish of Collesansonesco;
Non-citizen overseers: 2

The church of Colle Sansonesco
A small church, San Donato, is located in Colle Sansonesco. Nearby there is also an even smaller chapel dedicated to the Madonna delle Grazie. These holdings lie within the parochial boundaries of San Pietro ad Azzano.

The failed attempt to construct a Sanatorium in Colle Sansonesco
In the 1920s Colle Sansonesco was chosen as the location on which was to be built a sanatorium for the city of Teramo for the treatment of tuberculosis.  The treatment of this disease is enhanced by means of air that is cool and fresh and Colle Sansonesco seemed at the time the ideal location. A resident, Alfonso Di Vestea, was selected as the local point of contact for the project development. The worked was to be completed in conjunction with Roman authorities including a Doctor Amendolagine and a ministerial inspector by the name of Sirleo. 
An engineering firm, Valente, presented the initial design proposals in August 1923. Funds were to come from a state agency which had been commissioned after World War I to improve the country's public health and welfare. The Province of Teramo also underwrote the operation and issued bonds for its completion. The final plans were prepared by a Roman engineer, Gaetano Galli, in November 1924. Modifications were proposed, incorporated into the final design specifications, and approved by the local Prefecture in June 1926. Ground was broken shortly thereafter. This work was soon interrupted, after it was discovered that the soil below the construction site was friable and would never safely support a building of this magnitude. 
With the support of The Confraternity of Charity of Teramo (Congrega di Carità di Teramo) it was then decided to build the sanatorium in Villa Mosca. This area, about 1 mile from the city center, is located on a gentle slope at a slightly higher elevation than Teramo and is easily reachable by foot or by public transport. The development of this new project was awarded to a local engineer, Alfonso De Albentiis. The first contracts were approved in November 1927. Work was completed in 1934 when the facility was first opened to the public. In order to further freshen the air, a great number of pine trees were planted in the vicinity of the sanatorium. The structure today functions as a geriatriccenter and, thanks to the pine saplings that were planted 70 years ago, sits amidst a stand of majestic pines trees.

Bibliography
Luigi Ercole, Dizionario topografico alfabetico della provincia di Teramo, Berardo Carlucci e Compagni, Teramo, 1804, p. 38; ristampato dall'editore Arnaldo Forni, Bologna, 1984;
Niccola Palma, Storia ecclesiastica e civile della regione più settentrionale del regno di Napoli. Detta dagli antichi Prætutium, ne' bassi tempi Aprutium oggi città di Teramo e Diocesi Aprutina, opera in 5 voll., Teramo, presso U. Angeletti, 1832-1836; II edizione a cura di Vittorio Savorini e altri, 5 voll., Teramo, Tip. Giovanni Fabbri, 1890-1893; III edizione, 5 voll. Teramo, Cassa di Risparmio della Provincia di Teramo, 1978;
Gabriele Di Cesare, Torricella Sicura. Lineamenti storici, Eco editrice, Isola del G. Sasso (Te), 1989, pp. 93–94;
Gabriele Di Cesare, L'Ospedale Sanatoriale di Teramo, in "Notizie dell'Economia Teramana", Teramo, XXXVI, n. 1-2, 1983;
Marcello Mazzoni, Storia sociale e sanitaria della tubercolosi a Teramo, in "Notizie dalla Delfico", Teramo, n. 1-2, 2001, pp. 18–42;

See also
Torricella Sicura

External links
 Colle Sansonesco

Frazioni of the Province of Teramo